Hal Wilson (also credited Harold Wilson; born Hippocrates Wolfarth, October 2, 1861 – May 22, 1933), was a character actor who appeared in silent films. He was born in New York City. He was a denizen of Hollywood. He had a significant role in The Man Trap.

Wilson got into acting at age 10 and was in his first feature film in 1915. There is some debate about his birth year. Per a 1921 studio guide, he acted on the stage for 20 years, including for Harrigan and Hart, Charles Frohman, Albert H. Woods, and the Murray Hill Theatre Stock Company under Henry V. Donnelly, before moving to film in 1907.

Wilson married Ethel Harbord, born Elizabeth Laura Sophia Pirani (b. 1869) in Melbourne, Australia, on May 13, 1896. He died in Los Angeles in 1933.

Selected filmography
 Lady Godiva (1911), short film
Cardinal Wolsey (1912)
The Cross-Roads (1912), short film
Faithful Until Death (1912), Vitagraph short film
The Spider's Web (1912)
Rob Roy (1913) as Jarvie
The Sable Lorcha (1915)
The Little School Ma'am (1916) as Washington
Casey at the Bat (1916) as a doctor
The Midnight Man (1917) as Mr. Moore
The End of the Tour (1917)
The Little Yank (1917)
 Betsy's Burglar (1917)
 The Man Trap (1917)
Her Official Fathers (1917)
Kingdom Come (1919)
Dinty (1920)
Whispering Devils (1920)
Suds (1920)
The Secret Four (1921)
 The Unknown Wife (1921)
Charge It (1921)
Nan of the North (1922), a film serial, as Gaspar Le Sage
Forget Me Not (1922)
Blaze Away (1922)
According to Hoyle (1922)
Main Street (1923)
The Love Master (1924) as Alec McLeod
 Smilin' at Trouble (1925)
Divorce Made Easy (1929)

References

External links

1861 births
1933 deaths
American male film actors
American male silent film actors
20th-century American male actors